= Banggwijaengi myeoneuri =

Orally transmitted Korean folk tale

Banggwijaengi myeoneuri (방귀쟁이 며느리 The Farting Daughter-in-law) is an orally transmitted Korean folk tale.

It is the story of a Korean woman who produces loud destructive farts. When one fart severely damages her husband's house, his family throws her out. However, her flatulence later proves beneficial to the family and she is welcomed back.

== History and transmission ==
Banggwijaengi myeoneuri is recorded in almost 100 different versions in key oral tale collections including Hanguk gubi munhak daegye [한국구비문학대계 Outlines of Korean Oral Literature]. It is told throughout the Korean Peninsula.

== Plot ==
=== Basic plot ===
In a household long ago, the daughter-in-law looked sick and was growing thinner. When her in-laws got worried asked her what was wrong, she answered that it was because she could not fart. When they heard this, her mother- and father-in-law told her not to worry and urged her to fart freely. The daughter-in-law answered that her farts were extremely powerful. She urged the family to prepare thoroughly, telling her father-in-law to hold on to a column, her mother-in-law to the door, her husband to the kitchen door, and her sister-in-law to the rice pot. When she farted, it was so powerful that the house was badly damaged, with some parts flying off and other parts collapsing.

When they saw the strength of her fart, her parents-in-law decided to send her back to her original family. She followed her father-in-law back there. On the way, they met a peddler. The daughter-in-law made a bet with him that she could pick some fruit from a tree. She got the fruit down by doing an enormous fart and received a good item from the peddler in return. When he saw this, her father-in-law realized that his daughter-in-law's farts were useful and took her back to his house.

=== Variations ===
Variations on Banggwijaengi myeoneuri are broadly as follows.

First are those variations where the story finishes when the daughter-in-law does a huge fart. Second are variations in which the fart blows away either just the parents-in-law or the parents-in-law and the husband, widowing the protagonist. Third are variations in which the story ends with the daughter-in-law being kicked out by her in-laws for farting. Fourthly are variations in which, instead of meeting a peddler on the way back to her blood family, the daughter-in-law farts to knock down some pears or daechu (jujubes) from high up in a tree for her father-in-law after he expresses a desire to eat them, then returns to her husband's home. Finally, the wares sold by the peddler differ in some versions, with variations including brassware, silk, hemp cloth, sundries or wooden bowls.

== Features and significance ==
Banggwijaengi myeoneuri is a folk tale but has mythical qualities. Firstly, the daughter-in-law, with farts powerful enough to send houses and people flying and strip fruit from high branches, resembles a female giant in a myth. The resounding farts she emits can be seen as an inheritance from excremental motifs in giant tales; among the various types of excretion, farting is one that induces particular mirth. Moreover, the way the daughter-in-law is expelled from her in-laws’ home before returning again can be seen as a kind of “rite of passage” whereby a daughter-in-law gains the acceptance of her husband's family.

== Other ==
Banggwijaengi myeoneuri is a type of “farter tale.” Such comedic tales include not only Banggwijaengi myeoneuri, with its flatulent daughter-in-law protagonist, but various other stories including those about competitions among farters, and those in which thieves are chased away by farts.
